Baron Northbrook, of Stratton in the County of Southampton, is a title in the Peerage of the United Kingdom. It was created in 1866 for the Liberal politician and former Chancellor of the Exchequer, Sir Francis Baring, 3rd Baronet. The holders of the barony represent the genealogically senior branch of the prominent Baring family. The name Northbrook is derived from a tithing of the local parish.

History
The holders of the barony descend from Francis Baring, whose father had emigrated to Great Britain from Germany. Francis was the founder of the family firm that grew into Barings Bank. The firm increased in wealth and influence to the point that, on 29 May 1793, Francis was created a baronet, of Larkbeer in the County of Devon, in the Baronetage of Great Britain. His eldest son Thomas became the second Baronet, also representing Chipping Wycombe and Hampshire in the House of Commons. Sir Thomas was succeeded by his eldest son Francis, third Baronet. Sir Francis held office as Chancellor of the Exchequer and First Lord of the Admiralty. In 1866 he was raised to the Peerage of the United Kingdom as Baron Northbrook, of Stratton in the County of Southampton.

Lord Northbrook's eldest son Thomas, the second Baron, was Viceroy of India from 1872 to 1876. In that year he was created Viscount Baring, of Lee in the County of Kent, and Earl of Northbrook, in the County of Southampton. Both titles were in the Peerage of the United Kingdom. On his death, the titles passed to his eldest son Francis George, second Earl. He sat as a Member of Parliament for Winchester and Biggleswade. The second Earl was childless, and on his death in 1929, the viscountcy and earldom became extinct. He was succeeded in the baronetcy and barony by his first cousin Francis Arthur, who became the fourth Baron Northbrook. Francis Arthur was the son of the Hon. Francis Baring (1850–1915), third son of the first Baron and a partner in Barings Bank.

 the titles are held by the fourth Baron's grandson, the sixth Baron, who succeeded his father in 1990. Lord Northbrook is one of the ninety elected hereditary peers who remain in the House of Lords after the passing of the House of Lords Act 1999, and sits on the Conservative benches.

The Baring family is one of the most ennobled in the United Kingdom and numerous other members of the family have gained distinction. The first Baron Northbrook's uncle (his father's next youngest brother) was Alexander Baring, 1st Baron Ashburton, two of his first cousins (both sons of Henry Baring, his father's next youngest brother after Lord Ashburton) were Edward Baring, 1st Baron Revelstoke, and Evelyn Baring, 1st Earl of Cromer, and one of his first cousins once removed (third son of Lord Cromer) was Evelyn Baring, 1st Baron Howick of Glendale. Also, the Right Reverend Charles Baring, Bishop of Durham, was his younger brother. The Bishop's son Thomas was a banker and Conservative politician.

Titleholders

Baring baronets, of Larkbeer (1793)
 Sir Francis Baring, 1st Baronet (1740–1810)
 Sir Thomas Baring, 2nd Baronet (1772–1848)
 Sir Francis Thornhill Baring, 3rd Baronet (1796–1866) (created Baron Northbrook in 1866)

Barons Northbrook (1866)
 Francis Thornhill Baring, 1st Baron Northbrook (1796–1866)
 Thomas George Baring, 2nd Baron Northbrook (1826–1904) (created Earl of Northbrook in 1876)

Earls of Northbrook (1876)
 Thomas George Baring, 1st Earl of Northbrook (1826–1904)
 Francis George Baring, 2nd Earl of Northbrook (1850–1929)

Barons Northbrook (1866; reverted)
 Francis Arthur Baring, 4th Baron Northbrook (1882–1947)
 Francis John Baring, 5th Baron Northbrook (1915–1990)
 Francis Thomas Baring, 6th Baron Northbrook (born 1954)

There is no heir to the barony.
The heir presumptive to the baronetcy is the present holder's fourth cousin, Peter Baring (born 1939). He is a great-great-grandson of the Right Reverend Charles Baring, younger son of the second Baronet.
The heir presumptive's heir apparent is his son, Samuel Nigel Baring (born 1987).

Family tree

See also
 Northbrook Hall
 Baron Ashburton
 Earl of Cromer
 Baron Revelstoke
 Baron Howick of Glendale

Notes

References

External links

Baronies in the Peerage of the United Kingdom
Northbrook
Noble titles created in 1866
Noble titles created for UK MPs